HMS Lawson (K516) was a British Captain-class frigate of the Royal Navy in commission during World War II. Originally constructed as the United States Navy Evarts-class destroyer escort DE-518, she served in the Royal Navy from 1943 to 1946.

Construction and transfer
The ship was laid down by the Boston Navy Yard in Boston, Massachusetts, on 9 July 1943 as the unnamed U.S. Navy destroyer escort DE-518 and launched on 13 August 1943. The United States transferred the ship to the United Kingdom under Lend-Lease on 15 November 1943.

Service history
The ship was commissioned into service in the Royal Navy as HMS Lawson (K516) on 15 November 1943 simultaneously with her transfer. She served on patrol and escort duty in the North Atlantic Ocean for the remainder of World War II, and also supported the Allied invasion of Normandy in June 1944.

After the conclusion of the war, the Royal Navy steamed Lawson to the United States, bringing her into port at the Philadelphia Naval Shipyard in Philadelphia, Pennsylvania, on 12 March 1946. The United Kingdom officially returned her to United States custody on 20 March 1946.

Disposal
The United States sold Lawson on 31 January 1947 for scrapping.

References

Navsource Online: Destroyer Escort Photo Archive DE-518 HMS Lawson (K-516)
uboat.net HMS Lawson (K 516)
Captain Class Frigate Association HMS Lawson K516 (DE 518)

External links
 Photo gallery of HMS Lawson (K516)

 

Captain-class frigates
Evarts-class destroyer escorts
World War II frigates of the United Kingdom
World War II frigates and destroyer escorts of the United States
Ships built in Boston
1943 ships